Raja Bharmal, also known as Bihari Mal, Bhagmal and Bihar Mal ( 1498 – 27 January 1574), was the 22nd Rajput ruler of Amber, which was later known as Jaipur, in the present-day Rajasthan state of India.   

His daughter, Mariam-uz-Zamani (popularly known as Jodha Bai), was the chief consort of the 3rd Mughal Emperor, Akbar and mother of the 4th Mughal Emperor Jahangir. His daughter's marriage to Akbar was a significant events of the Mughal Empire. He along with his successor, Bhagwant Das and his grandson, Man Singh I became the highest mansabdar of their times. He died in Agra in 1574.

Family and accession

Bharmal was the fourth son of Raja Prithviraj or Prithvi Singh I of Amer (r. 17 January 1503 – 4 November 1527), and Rani Apoorva Devi or Bala Bai of the Rathore clan, the daughter of Rao Lunkaran of the Bikaner royal family.

After the death of Prithviraj in 1527, Raja Puranmal (r. 5 November 1527 – 19 January 1534), his eldest son by Tanwar queen succeeded him. He died at the Battle of Mandrail on 19 January 1534, while helping the Mughal Emperor Humayun recapture the fort of Bayana. He had a son named Sujamal. But Sujamal could not succeed his father as he was a minor at that time.

Puranmal was succeeded by his younger brother Bhim Singh (r.1534 - 22 July 1537), the next eldest son of Rani Apoorva Devi. The dispossessed Sujamal took shelter with the Tanwar royal family. Bhim Singh was succeeded by his eldest son, Ratan Singh (r. 1537 - 15 May 1548). He was killed by his half-brother Askaran, who became the king the next day. But the nobles of Amber joined to depose him and on 1 June 1548, aged around 50, Bharmal became the ruler of Amer. Raja Bharmal had at least 13 sons, including Bhagwant Das, his successor and at least four daughters including Mariam-uz-Zamani, Empress consort of Emperor Akbar and Kishanawati, wife of Haji Khan Pathan.

Reign

Situation at the beginning of his reign

When Bharmal's eldest brother Puranmal succeeded the throne in 1527, the political scenario was very uncertain. The Rajput confederacy led by Rana Sanga suffered a great loss in the battle of Khanua. The Mughal power was not firmly established in India. There were other Muslim rulers, who were gaining the power to oust Humayun, the son of Babur out of India. Bahadur Shah of Gujarat and Sher Khan (later Sher Shah Suri) were prominent among them.

Puranmal was the first person to realize that Mughals were not at all trustworthy. They were very much like the old stock of Muslim rulers. Bharmal's policy towards Mughals that us marrying his daughter to Akbar was part of a plan to protect the population of Amer.

Bahadur Shah was pursuing a policy of expansion. He helped and sent Tatar Khan Lodi to occupy the fort of Bayana. He occupied the fort of Bayana which was under Mughal occupation since the time of Babur. Humayun sent his brothers Askari Mirza and Hindal Mirza to recapture the fort. Puranmal, then Raja of Amer, fought in the battle called the Battle of Mandrail in favor of the Mughals in 1534.

He did not inherit his father's kingdom according to the principles laid down by Manu, instead, he was a collective choice from all the Kachwahas, dominated at that time by Bara Kotris. Emperor Akbar pursued a liberal policy towards his Hindu subjects and Raja Bharmal's descendants offered their services to Mughals to save the Hindus from the cruelty of Turks led by Akbar which became a strong empire, due to Kachwaha's support. The Dhundhar region of Rajputana never faced a war until Aurangzeb's reign. This can be attributed to the clever plan laid down by Raja Bharmal in the backdrop of marriage.

Akbar and Bharmal
In 1556, Bharmal helped Majnun Khan Qaqshal, a Mughal commandant, which Majnun Khan later narrated to Akbar.  Akbar subsequently invited Bharmal to the court of Delhi and honored him, his sons, and other relatives by giving robe of honor. At this time, while Akbar was trying to tame a wild elephant, the intoxicated elephant ran towards people which led to a commotion while they were trying to escape, however when the elephant approached the ground of Rajput nobles, they stood their ground by loyalty. This act of Amer nobles impressed Emperor who then enquired about the Raja Bharmal and pleased with his valor said, "We will rear you".

In 1562, the situation became critical for the Kachwahas when Mirza Muhammad Sharaf-ud-din Hussain was appointed Mughal governor of Mewat. Sujamal reached his court and received his support for winning the throne of Amer. Mirza led a large army to Amber and Bharmal was in no position to resist. He forced the Kachwahas to leave Amber and live in forests and hills. Bharmal promised a fixed tribute to Mirza and handed over his own son, Jagannath, and his nephews, Raj Singh (son of Askaran) and Khangar Singh (son of Jagmal), as hostages for its due payment.

When Sharaf-ud-din was preparing to invade Amber again, Bharmal met Akbar's courtier, Chaghtai Khan. Luckily for the Raja of Amer, Akbar was at Karavali (a village near Agra) on his way from Agra to Ajmer (on a pilgrimage to the dargah of Khwaja Moinuddin Chisti), Chaghtai Khan pleaded on behalf of Bharmal for his protection, which he agreed and summoned the Raja to his court. Accordingly, the latter's brother, Rupsi Bairagi, and his son, Jaimal, met Akbar at Dausa and Bharmal himself met Akbar at his camp at Sanganer on 20 January 1562.

Chaghtai Khan introduced Bharmal and his relatives, who proposed to give his eldest daughter, Hira Kunwari, in marriage to Akbar. Akbar consented and ordered Chaghtai Khan to make the necessary arrangements. Upon Akbar's arrival in Sambhar on his return journey from Ajmer, Mirza surrendered his hostages Jagannath, Raj Singh, and Khangar to Akbar. Bharmal also reached Sambhar and on 6 February 1562, his daughter Mariam-uz-Zamani was married to Akbar.

On 10 February 1562 Akbar's new Kachwaha relatives again came to his camp at Ratanpura to take formal leave from him. Here, Man Singh was presented to him. From there, Bhagwant Das, Man Singh and a number of their relatives accompanied Akbar to Agra.

After this marriage, he was immediately made the commander of 5000 cavalry units, the highest rank possible for a noble in the Mughal court. He was in the words of Nizamuddin Ahmad, one of the renowned Rajas of Hindustan who came into service of the Emperor with great favors and royal benefactions. He was distinguished among the Rajput clan for his valor and sincere devotion and loyalty and is regarded as one of Akbar's most loyal, courageous, and competent commanders and rose to great favor of the Emperor. Tarikh-i-Salim notes, 'In correctness, allegiance and courage he was truly outstanding amongst his people'. Abul Fazl in the praise of his family describes Amer kingdom as 'having a fine genetic pool'.

Succession
Raja Bharmal was succeeded by his eldest son, Raja Bhagwant Das, after his death.

Issue
Raja Bharmal had at least thirteen sons and four daughters:
 Raja Bhagwant Das
 Raja Bhagwan Das Bankawat
 Mariam-uz-Zamani
 Kishanawati Bai
 Kunwar Bhopat
 Raja Jagannath Singh 
 Sukanya of Dwangarh
 Kunwar Sudar
 Kunwar Lalhodi 
 Kunwar Prathideep  
 Roopchad Singh 
 Kunwar Parasraam
 four unknown sons and one unknown daughter

In popular culture
 2013–2015: Jodha Akbar, broadcast on Zee TV, where he was played by Rajeev Saxena.
 Kulbhushan Kharbanda portrayed Raja Bharmal in the 2008 film Jodhaa Akbar directed by Ashutosh Gowarikar.

Ancestry

References

Maharajas of Jaipur
1491 births
1574 deaths
People from Jaipur district